Mee Pok Man is a 1995 Singaporean film directed by Eric Khoo. The film is Eric Khoo's debut feature, released under his film production company, Zhao Wei Films, after making award-winning short films for years. It was entered into the 19th Moscow International Film Festival and showed at more than 30 film festivals worldwide, winning the FIPRESCI (The International Federation of Film Critics) Award.

The film stars Joe Ng as the male protagonist Johnny, a Chinese seller of noodles (mee pok), and Michelle Goh, who plays a prostitute. The film was given an "R(A)" rating in Singapore, restricting the movie audience to adults aged 21 and above, but after the change in film ratings in 2004, it was re-rated "M18" (aged 18 and above).

The film's story was inspired by a story by Damien Sin, "One Last Cold Kiss", that appeared in Classic Singapore Horror Stories: Book 2 (1994). Khoo was supposed to illustrate the story about a mortuary attendant who falls in love with a fresh corpse, brings it back home, and has a relationship with it.

The soundtrack album was released under BMG and featured the film score by Kevin Mathews and music by Singaporean acts including The Padres (a band fronted by Joe Ng, the film's male lead actor), Opposition Party, Livonia, Etc and Sugarflies.

In November 2015, the film was restored by the Asian Film Archive and presented at the 26th Singapore International Film Festival. The restored film also enjoyed a run at independent cinema The Projector, which also celebrated its legacy with talks.

In 2019, the film was presented at the inaugural New York Asian Film Festival winter showcase.

References

External links
Official site

1990s English-language films
1990s Cantonese-language films
1990s Mandarin-language films
Hokkien-language films
1995 romantic comedy films
1995 films
Films directed by Eric Khoo
Singaporean romantic comedy films
1995 multilingual films
Singaporean multilingual films